Cytoplasmic dynein 1 intermediate chain 1 is a protein that in humans is encoded by the DYNC1I1 gene.

In melanocytic cells DYNC1I1 gene expression may be regulated by MITF.

Interactions
DYNC1I1 has been shown to interact with DYNLL1.

References

Further reading